Homer Baker (June 8, 1893 – November 25, 1977) was an American, middle-distance track and field athlete. He became US national half-mile champion in 1913 and 1914. He toured Europe during 1914 and won the British 880-yard crown from the famed Albert Hill. Baker had poor eyesight and withdrew from running for 18 months after a 1917 accident in the New York City Subway. He did the 880 yards (half-mile) in 1,56,4 and 660 yards in 1,20,4 (world record holding up for 26 years). In 1923 he was appointed physical director in the Panama Canal Zone.

References

1893 births
1977 deaths
American male middle-distance runners
Track and field athletes from Buffalo, New York